The Woman with Gambling Mania (French: La Folle Monomane du jeu) is an 1822 painting by Théodore Géricault. It is a member of a series of ten portraits of people with specific manias done by Géricault between 1820 and 1824, including Portrait of a Kleptomaniac and Insane Woman. Following the controversy surrounding his The Raft of the Medusa, Géricault fell into a depression. In return for help by psychiatrist Étienne-Jean Georget, Géricault offered him a series of paintings of mental patients, including this one, in a time when the scientific world was curious about the minds of the mentally insane. A solid example of romanticism, Géricault's portrait of a mental asylum patient attempts to show a specific form of insanity through facial expression.

This painting was acquired by the Louvre in 1938.

References

External links

1822 paintings
Paintings by Théodore Géricault
Paintings in the Louvre by French artists